Get Me may refer to:
"Get Me" (song), by Justin Bieber in 2020
"Get Me", a song by Dinosaur Jr. from their 1993 album Where You Been
"Get Me", a song by Everything But The Girl from their	1994 album Amplified Heart
"Get Me", a song by MYMP from their 2005 album Beyond Acoustic
"Get Me", a song by Reset from their 1999 album Play
"Get Me", a song by Sia from her 2001 album Healing Is Difficult
"Get Me", a song by Twista from his 2004 album	Kamikaze